Theta Tauri (θ Tauri, abbreviated Theta Tau, θ Tau) is a wide double star in the constellation of Taurus and a member of the Hyades open cluster.

θ Tauri is composed of two 3rd magnitude stars, designated Theta Tauri (Theta Tauri B) and Theta Tauri (Theta Tauri A). Theta² is brighter, hence the pair are sometimes referred to as Theta Tauri B and A, respectively. They are separated by 5.62 arcminutes (0.094°) on the sky.

Nomenclature 

θ Tauri (Latinised to Theta Tauri) is the double star's Bayer designation; θ Tauri and θ Tauri those of its two constituents. The designations of the two constituents as Theta Tauri A and B, and those of the four components - Theta Tauri Aa, Ab, Ba and Bb - derive from the convention used by the Washington Multiplicity Catalog (WMC) for multiple star systems, and adopted by the International Astronomical Union (IAU).

In the mythology of the Maya peoples, Theta Tauri is known as Chamukuy, meaning a small bird in the Yucatec Maya language. In 2016, the IAU organized a Working Group on Star Names (WGSN) to catalog and standardize proper names for stars. The WGSN decided to attribute proper names to individual stars rather than entire multiple systems. It approved the name Chamukuy for the component Theta Tauri Aa on 5 September 2017 and it is now so included in the List of IAU-approved Star Names.

Properties 

Theta Tauri A has a mean apparent magnitude of +3.40. It is classified as a Delta Scuti type variable star and its brightness varies from magnitude +3.35 to +3.42 with a period of 1.82 hours. Its primary component, Theta Tauri Aa, is a white A-type giant. The secondary, Theta Tauri Ab, is of the 6th magnitude and is 0.005 arcseconds, or at least 2 AU, distant. It completes an orbit once every 141 days.

Theta Tauri B is the dimmer constituent. Its primary component, Theta Tauri Ba, is an orange K-type giant with an apparent magnitude of +3.84. The secondary, Theta Tauri Bb, is of the 7th-magnitude.

References

External links
 Observing Naked-eye Stars

Tauri, Theta
Taurus (constellation)
4
Delta Scuti variables
Spectroscopic binaries
G-type giants
A-type giants
Hyades (star cluster)
Tauri, 77 8
020885 94
028307 19
1411 2
BD+15 0631